Qanbar Mahalleh (also Romanized as Qanbar Maḩalleh; also known as Qanbarī Maḩalleh and Qanbarī Maḩalleh-ye Sībelī) is a village in Lavandevil Rural District, Lavandevil District, Astara County, Gilan Province, Iran. At the 2006 census, its population was 644, in 149 families.

Language 
Linguistic composition of the village.

References 

Populated places in Astara County

Azerbaijani settlements in Gilan Province

Talysh settlements in Gilan Province